The Seville derby (Derbi Sevillano), also known as The Great Derby (El Gran Derbi), is the name of a local city derby located in Seville, Spain contested between Real Betis and Sevilla.

Sevilla FC were founded in 1890. This was followed (September 1907) by the city's second club 'Sevilla Balompié'. Following an internal split from Sevilla FC another club was formed, Betis Football Club. 1914 saw the culmination of a merger between Betis Football Club and Sevilla Balompié. With the patronage title, the club became Real Betis Balompié. On 8 October 1915, the first Seville derby took place, ending with a 4–3 Sevilla victory. 

Sevilla are located in the richer Nervión district of Seville and play at the Estadio Ramón Sánchez Pizjuán while Real Betis play in the Heliopolis region at the Estadio Benito Villamarín and are backed more by the working class.

Honours

League matches

Cup matches

European matches

Head-to-head results

Head-to-head ranking in La Liga (1929–2022)

• Total: Sevilla with 50 higher finishes, Betis with 28 higher finishes (as of the end of the 2021–22 season).

Goalscorer records
Only league and cup matches since the 1980–81 season counted.

Bold denotes players still playing for either of the two teams.

References

Sevilla
Derbi
Derbi
Recurring sporting events established in 1915
Sport in Seville
Football in Andalusia